PKN3 is a protein kinase C-related molecule and thought to be an effector mediating malignant cell growth downstream of activated phosphoinositide 3-kinase (PI3K). It is thought that chronic activation of the phosphoinositide 3-kinase (PI3K)/PTEN signal transduction pathway contributes to metastatic cell growth and that PKN3 may mediate that growth.1

PKN3 is required for invasive prostate cell growth as assessed by 3D cell culture assays and in an orthotopic mouse tumor model by inducible expression of short hairpin RNA (shRNA). PKN3 may represent a target for therapeutic intervention in cancers that lack tumor suppressor PTEN function or depend on chronic activation of PI3K.

Interactions 

PKN3 (gene) has been shown to interact with ARHGAP26.

References

Further reading 

 
 
 
 
 

EC 2.7.11